Only is a free Canadian bi-monthly news and entertainment magazine published in Vancouver, British Columbia by the Only Trust - who also organize Vancouver's Music Waste Festival and Victory Square Block Party. The paper has a circulation of 10,000 in the Vancouver area. Its first issue ran on October 8, 2004.

Only Magazine was founded just days before its inaugural issue after the publisher-editor Darren Atwater was fired from the Vancouver weekly Terminal City that he had started over a decade before. In solidarity, many of the Terminal City staff walked out and formed Only Magazine. In an editorial about the takeover that appeared in issue 1, the Only staff writes:

Only Magazine focuses heavily on covering the fringes of Vancouver's creative communities, but often runs interviews with touring bands such as Deerhoof, Wolf Eyes, Black Dice, and Erase Errata. Most articles are written with a sense of irreverence and poignant satire that is often criticized as overly critical which has caused a number of controversies in the magazine's short life.

In February 2007, after 60 issues the print magazine was put on hiatus for restructuring. The magazine continues all of its editorial online at onlymagazine.ca.

In March 2007, Only Magazine launched its first all-Vancouver music podcast and a widget to count down the days until the supposed 2010 Olympic riot.

The magazine's cover is often done by Vancouver artists and students from Emily Carr Institute of Art and Design.

Contents 
Random Interview An interview with anyone by Chuck Ansbacher

Mental Health Pop Culture/Social Analysis Editorial by Amil Niazi

News Editorial covering civic and local issues by Sean Condon

Credit Check Short comments on civic politics and changes to the city by the Only

Science Interesting developments in the world of science by Alan Hindle (who had previously been writing Theatre)

Rap Interviews and articles on local and touring rap artists by Rhek

Film/Film School Interviews and articles on Canadian and international films by Adam O. Thomas

Music/Discotext Interviews and reviews of local and touring bands by the music editor and contributors

Killer Deadly A local music roundup of live reviews and upcoming events. Often updates on new venues and those recently defunct by the music editor and contributors

Art/Art Fag Interviews with emerging artists and articles on happenings in the local art community by contributing art writers

Dozen Things Five photos and seven listings with write ups of upcoming events by the Only

Last Stand An editorial of varied local and national issues ranging from endings of local hotspots to beginnings of foreign wars by the Only.

Comics
 Maakies by Tony Millionaire
 Bad, Mad Bad by Liane Morrissette
 Total Jeopardy by Mark Delong
 Overheard by Finnigan Muddville (no longer running)

Contributors (past and present) 
Publisher Darren Atwater (October '04 - present)

Editor
 Amil Niazi (October '04 - May '06)
 Sarah Cordingley (May '06 - May '07)
 Chuck Ansbacher (May '07 - May '08)

Arts Editor Alan Hindle (October '04 - present)

Film Editor Adam O. Thomas (October '04 - present)

Managing Editor
 Chuck Ansbacher (September '06 - May '07)
 Adam O. Thomas (May '07 - present)

Copy Editor Mayana C. Slobodian (March '06 - July '07)

Rap Editor Rhek (October '04 - present)

Music Editor
John Cow (October '04 - January '05)
Sarah Cordingley (January '05 - May '06)
Cameron Reed (September '06 - present)

Food and Drink Editor David Look (October '06 - May '08)

Production
 Naomi MacDougall
 Tome Jozic

Web Production
 Darren Atwater
 David Look

Contributors Sarah Albertson, Chris-a-riffic, Curtis Grahauer, Sean Condon, Sean Arden, Kayla Guthrie, Asher Penn, Kevin Spenst, Phil Oats, David Look, Brynna Childs, Martin Thacker, Ben Lai, Charles Demers and photographs by Dan Siney.

External links
 

2004 establishments in British Columbia
Alternative magazines
Bi-monthly magazines published in Canada
Online magazines published in Canada
Defunct magazines published in Canada
Magazines established in 2004
Magazines disestablished in 2007
Magazines published in Vancouver
Online magazines with defunct print editions
Free magazines